City of Dreams is a historical novel by Beverly Swerling, published in 2001. It is the multi-generational history of a family of immigrants set in Nieuw Amsterdam and early Manhattan.

City of Dreams
City of Dreams
Family saga novels
Novels set in the American colonial era
Novels set in New York City